SS Mantola was a passenger steamer of the British-India Steam Navigation Company. Launched in 1916 by Barclay Curle & Company, Glasgow, she sailed for less than a year before being sunk by a German U-boat while carrying a large quantity of silver bullion.

Construction and career
Mantola was built by the Glasgow-based shipbuilders Barclay Curle & Company and launched on 22 March 1916. Entering service during the First World War, her short career was eventful. She struck a mine off Aldeburgh on 30 October 1916, while sailing from Middlesbrough and London bound for Calcutta carrying general cargo. There were no casualties and though damaged the ship survived.

Sinking
After repairs the Mantola sailed again from London on 4 February 1917, bound for Calcutta. She carried 165 crew, 18 passengers, and general cargo including around 600,000 ounces of silver. Weisbach torpedoed the Mantola, causing her captain, D.J. Chivas, and the crew to abandon ship. Though there were no casualties in the initial attack, a party of seven Indian seamen drowned when their lifeboat overturned. U-81 then began to shell the still floating Mantola, until being chased away by the  sloop . Laburnum took the floating hulk under tow, but the line parted in the rough seas, and Mantola was left to sink, which she did on 9 February. Laburnum carried the survivors to shore and landed them at Bantry Bay.

In 1917, the British Ministry of War Transport paid a War Risk Insurance Claim for £110,000 (£ in ) for silver that was on board when the ship sank.

Rediscovery
The Department for Transport awarded a salvage contract to the company to begin recovery of the cargo in return for Odyssey Marine retaining 80% of the value recovered, the total value of the cargo estimated to be around £12,000,000.

References

1916 ships
Ships built on the River Clyde
Steamships of the United Kingdom
Ships of the British India Steam Navigation Company
Ships sunk by German submarines in World War I
World War I merchant ships of the United Kingdom
World War I shipwrecks in the Atlantic Ocean
Maritime incidents in 1917